Igisoro is a two-player game of the mancala family. It is a variant of the Omweso game of the Baganda people (Uganda), and it is played primarily in Burundi and Rwanda. Igisoro, like Omweso and other mancalas from Eastern Africa such as Bao (game), is played with a 4×8 board of pits and 64 seeds. A player's territory is the two rows of pits closest to them.

Start 
The starting position is shown below; Each player starts with 4 seeds in each pit in the back row of their territory.
However, any or both players may decide to start by seeds in fore row, or some seeds in fore and other in back row depending on the wish 
of the player.

Turns 
On his turn, a player chooses a pit containing seeds in their territory and sows them placing one seed in each pit as s/he moves counter-clockwise around his territory. The board below shows the state after the first player chose to move the seeds from the pit highlighted in yellow.

At the end of a turn, there are two ways in which the players turn may continue:
 If the pit where the last seed is sown is not empty, the player picks up all seeds from this pit and begins to sow again, starting from the next pit.
 If the pit where the last seed is sown is not empty and both opponent's opposite pits are not empty, the player may pick up all seeds from these two pits and begins to sow again. When the player chooses to pick up his opponents seeds, the sowing begins again from the pit where the player originally began his or her turn, thus sowing seeds in the same pits as the original move.
 If the player in his turn chooses not to pick up his opponents seeds, he has to say it: "I pass" (ndahise). To which the opponent may reply "I retreat" (ndakubye). Then immediately retreats the seeds that were not picked.  The player retreats his/her seeds by picking the seeds in her/his pit at the front row and adding them to his/her adjacent pit in the last row, this is done while the other player is still sowing.

Only for a direct pick or catch, a player starting from, or arriving at the pits highlighted in yellow below may choose to move counter-clockwise. When s/he starts from any other pit, s/he may only move counter-clockwise.

Completion 
The game is over and a player has lost when he or she can not sow any of his or her seeds.

External links
 Website on Igisoro

Traditional mancala games